The Men's 50 metre freestyle event at the 2018 Commonwealth Games was held on 9 and 10 April at the Gold Coast Aquatic Centre.

Records
Prior to this competition, the existing world, Commonwealth and Games records were as follows:

The following records were established during the competition:

Results

Heats
The 16 fastest swimmers in the heats qualified for the semifinals.

Semifinals
The eight fastest swimmers from the semifinals progressed to the final.

Semifinal 1

Semifinal 2

Final
The final was held on 10 April at 19:45.

References

Men's 50 metre freestyle
Commonwealth Games